Red Oak Creek is a stream in Gasconade and Franklin counties of Missouri. It is a tributary of the Bourbeuse River.

 
Red Oak Creek was named for the red oak timber lining its course.

See also
List of rivers of Missouri

References

Rivers of Franklin County, Missouri
Rivers of Gasconade County, Missouri
Rivers of Missouri